Transcription elongation factor A protein-like 1 is a protein that in humans is encoded by the TCEAL1 gene.

This gene encodes a member of the transcription elongation factor A (SII)-like (TCEAL) gene family. Members of this family may function as nuclear phosphoproteins that modulate transcription in a promoter context-dependent manner. The encoded protein is similar to transcription elongation factor A/transcription factor SII and contains a zinc finger-like motif as well as a sequence related to the transcription factor SII Pol II-binding region. It may exert its effects via protein-protein interactions with other transcriptional regulators rather than via direct binding of DNA. Multiple family members are located on the X chromosome. Alternative splicing results in multiple transcript variants encoding a single isoform.

References

Further reading